John B. Smith (October 30, 1837 – April 4, 1917) was a Canadian-born American politician in the state of Washington. He served in the Washington House of Representatives.

References

Members of the Washington House of Representatives
1837 births
1917 deaths
Washington (state) Populists
Politicians from London, Ontario
19th-century American politicians
American people of Canadian descent